The  (literally "General Company of Belgium") was a large Belgian bank and later holdings company which existed between 1822 and 2003.

The Société générale was originally founded as an investment bank by William I of the Netherlands in 1822 when Belgium was under Dutch rule. After the Belgian Revolution in 1830, it served as the national bank until 1850. Its investments in the national economy contributed to the rapidity of the Industrial Revolution in the region. As a holding company, the Société générale exercised considerable indirect control over the Belgian and colonial economy.

Various elements of the company, including its banking wing, were split off over the course of its existence. In the 1980s, Suez begun to buy up the company's shares and, in 1998, the Société générale was taken over by Suez Lyonnaise des Eaux. It ceased to exist in 2003 when it was merged with Tractebel to form Suez-Tractebel.

History
As part of the terms of the Treaty of Paris in 1814, the countries of Europe agreed to augment their armed forces from militia to a standing army. Although Belgium had been offered independence by the Prussians, Lord Castlereagh vetoed it on the grounds that the country was too small to be economically viable, and the question then arose of who should govern it, the Austrians having washed their hands of it as a historical accident of the breakup of the Habsburg empire.

Although William I of the Netherlands refused initially on the grounds of the added expense involved in maintaining the said army, Castlereagh persuaded him by asking him if he preferred to be Prince of Orange or King of the Netherlands, adding that from a practical point of view the Belgian Ducal Estates amounted to a third of the country. He therefore founded the company in 1822 to administer these estates under the name  ("General Netherlands Society for Advantage to the National Industry"), with the overt goal of increasing the welfare of the country, but with the covert objective of covering these costs.

As the Standing Army project never got taken seriously by the rest of Europe in practice, and the delivery of the Company proved insufficient, the objectives changed in 1826 to the delivery of  a year as a "pension" to the King's personal account.

After the Belgian Revolution of 1830, the company became Belgian, under the French name , and it retained the Estates, which were sold off at low prices to the immediate circle of the Board. It then served until 1850 as the National Bank of Belgium. The  was an important provider of capital for the upcoming industry of Belgium in the 19th century.

In the years before the Second World War the company invested in roads, railroads and canals. It was also the main operation in the Belgian colony of Belgian Congo. After the 1929 Crash, the company split off its banking segment (1934), becoming the Generale Bank (now Fortis, which was later sold to BNP Paribas, resulting in BNP Paribas Fortis), but remained its largest stockholder.

Subsidiaries once (majority) owned by the 
  - electric construction — electronics
  — public utility
  — cargo and shipping company
  — public utility
  — public utility
  — arms manufacturer
  — bank
 , Belgian rolling stock manufacturing company
  — public utility
  — mining company
 Forminière

Governors
The following people were governors of Société générale during its existence as an independent company:
 (1823–1830)
Ferdinand de Meeûs (1830–1861)
Charles Liedts (1861–1877)
Victor Tesch (1877–1892)
 (1892–1913)
Jean Jadot (1913–1932)
Emile Francqui (1932–1935)
Alexandre Galopin (1935–1944)
Gaston Blaise (1944–1950)
Paul Gillet (1950–1961)
Max Nokin (1961–1974)
Paul-Emile Corbiau (1975–1980)
René Lamy (1981–1988)

References

Further reading

External links 

  (Images, etc.)
 The creation of the Société Générale des Pays-Bas to encourage industry in 1822 and Generale Bank, a major player in the development of Belgian industry at BNP Paribas Fortis
 

 
Banks of Belgium
Privately held companies of Belgium
Banks established in 1822
Banks disestablished in 2003
Companies of the Democratic Republic of the Congo
History of the Democratic Republic of the Congo
1822 establishments in the Netherlands
William I of the Netherlands
Holding companies of Belgium
Defunct banks of Belgium